The Jeep Liberty is a four door unibody compact SUV manufactured and marketed by Jeep for model years 2002–2012 over two generations, internally designed the KJ (2002-2007) and KK (2008-2012), respectively. Both generations were marketed globally, including as the Jeep Cherokee outside North America.

Introduced as a replacement for the Cherokee (XJ), the Liberty was priced between the Wrangler and Grand Cherokee and was the smallest of the 4-door Jeep SUVs until the car based 4-door Compass and Patriot arrived for 2007. Both generations were assembled at the Toledo North Assembly Plant in the United States and other countries including Egypt and Venezuela.  The KK generation was manufactured  alongside the closely related Dodge Nitro. Production ended in August, 2012. 

The Liberty was superseded by the Jeep Cherokee.

First generation KJ (2002–2007)

Inspired by styling from the Dakar and Jeepster concept vehicles, the Liberty replaced the discontinued Jeep Cherokee. 

The Liberty was the first Jeep vehicle to use rack and pinion steering, and was the first Jeep to use the two then-new PowerTech engines; the  2.4 L straight-4, which was discontinued in 2006, and the  3.7 L V6, as well as a short-lived 2.8 L VM Motori turbo diesel (2005-2006 only). The Liberty was also the first Jeep vehicle to use an independent front suspension since the 1963-1965 Jeep Wagoneer. 

Three trim levels were initially offered; Limited, Renegade and the base Sport. All were made available with either 2WD or 4WD. In 2005, all models received a minor facelift. The 2005, 2006 Renegade and 2005 Rocky Mountain Edition Liberties received an exclusive flat hood and taller grille. In 2007, the Renegade trim level was replaced with the Latitude and lost the Renegade trim's unique hood and grill. The Liberty was nominated for the North American Truck of the Year award for 2002, though safety recalls persisted.

Second generation KK (2008–2012)

The Jeep Liberty received a complete redesign for the 2008 model year and was marketed along with the closely related Dodge Nitro. The 2008 Liberty debuted at the 2007 New York International Auto Show.

With the smaller Patriot and Compass crossover SUVs now available to cater to economy-conscious buyers, the four-cylinder engine was dropped from the Liberty's offerings. The iron-block, aluminum-head V6 was the only engine available for 2008. Jeep discontinued the Liberty CRD for the American market because it could not meet tougher 2007 emissions standards for diesel engines. Transmission choices were both carry-overs: a six-speed manual or a four-speed automatic. Standard equipment included electronic stability control with roll mitigation, traction control, and anti-lock brakes with brake assist. Jeep offered a rare 2WD version on the "Jet" model. New Features included standard side airbags. Optional features are rain-sensing wipers, Sirius Satellite Radio, Bluetooth, a navigation system, and the MyGig entertainment system complete with a 30GB hard drive.

Total U.S. sales

Notes

References

External links

 

Liberty
Cars introduced in 2001
Cars discontinued in 2012
2010s cars
Compact sport utility vehicles
All-wheel-drive vehicles
Rear-wheel-drive vehicles
Motor vehicles manufactured in the United States